Dyckia dusenii is a plant species in the genus Dyckia. This species is native to Brazil.

References

dusenii
Flora of Brazil
Plants described in 1932